Louis Bosman Raymond (28 June 1895 – 30 January 1962) was a male tennis player from South Africa. At the 1920 Summer Olympics in Antwerp, Belgium, he defeated Ichiya Kumagai in the finals to win the gold medal.

He won the South African Championships six times; four consecutive titles from 1921 through 1924 as well as victories in 1930 and 1931.

In 1924 he made it to the semifinal of the singles event at the Wimbledon Championships, losing to eventual champion Jean Borotra in straight sets. In 1927 he reached the quarterfinal of the French Championship in which he was defeated by Bill Tilden.

Between 1919 and 1931, Raymond played in ten ties for the South African Davis Cup team and has a record of ten wins and eleven losses.

In Tilden's book, The Art of Lawn Tennis, Raymond is described as a "hard working and deserving player" and someone who "attains success by industry rather than natural talent".

References

External links
 
 
 
 

1895 births
1962 deaths
South African people of British descent
South African male tennis players
Tennis players at the 1920 Summer Olympics
Tennis players at the 1924 Summer Olympics
Olympic tennis players of South Africa
Olympic gold medalists for South Africa
Olympic medalists in tennis
Medalists at the 1920 Summer Olympics
Sportspeople from Pretoria
South African Republic people
White South African people